The 1973 Jean Becker Open, also known as the Paris Open, was a men's Grand Prix tennis tournament played on indoor hard courts. It was the 4th edition of the Paris Open (later known as the Paris Masters). It took place at the Palais omnisports de Paris-Bercy in Paris, France, from 29 October until 4 November 1973. Ilie Năstase won the singles title.

Finals

Singles

 Ilie Năstase defeated  Stan Smith 4–6, 6–1, 3–6, 6–0, 6–2
 It was Nastase's 14th singles title of the year and the 36th of his career.

Doubles

 Juan Gisbert Sr. /  Ilie Năstase defeated  Arthur Ashe /  Roscoe Tanner 6–2, 4–6, 7–5
 It was Gisbert Sr.'s 3rd title of the year and the 9th of his career. It was Nastase's 23rd title of the year and the 57th of his career.

References

External links 
 ITF tournament edition details
 ATP tournament profile